Club Biguá de Villa Biarritz, better known as simply Biguá, is a Uruguayan professional basketball team that is based in Montevideo. The team currently plays in the Uruguayan Basketball League. The men's basketball section is a part of a multi-sports club, which offers a wide variety of different sports. The multi-sports club was founded in 1931, after "Biguá" and "Club Biarritz" merged to form "Club Biguá de Villa Biarritz". 

Biguá has won seven national titles: 3 Uruguayan Federal Championships and 4 Uruguayan Basketball League titles.

History
In its history in domestic competitions, Biguá's basketball club won 3 Federal Championships (Uruguay's most important club tournament until 2003) in 1988, 1989 and 1990, 3 Liga Uruguaya de Básquet titles (the current version of the top-tier level Uruguayan basketball league) in 2007, 2008 and 2021, and the Torneo Super 4 title in 2008.

In international competitions, Biguá won 2 South American Club Championships, in 1992 and 2008. The club was also the runner-up in the 2022 edition of the FIBA Champions League Americas.

Honours and titles

National honors
Uruguayan Federal Championship
Champions (3): 1988, 1989, 1990
Uruguayan Basketball League 
Champions (4): 2007–08, 2008–09, 2021, 2022
Torneo Super 4
Winners (1): 2008

International honors
South American Club Championship
Champions (2): 1992, 2008

FIBA Champions League Americas
Runners-up (1): 2022

Current roster

Head coaches

References

External links
 Official website
 FIBA Champions League Americas Team Profile
 LatinBasket.com Team Profile

1931 establishments in Uruguay
Basketball teams established in 1931
Basketball teams in Montevideo
Basketball teams in Uruguay